Salifu Adam Braimah is a Ghanaian politician and member of the Seventh Parliament of the Fourth Republic of Ghana representing the Salaga South Constituency in the Northern Region on the ticket of the New Patriotic Party.

References

Ghanaian MPs 2017–2021
1965 births
Living people
Ghanaian Muslims
New Patriotic Party politicians